Udea proximalis is a moth in the family Crambidae. It was described by Hiroshi Inoue, Hiroshi Yamanaka and Akio Sasaki in 2008. It is found on Hokkaido island in Japan.

References

proximalis
Moths described in 2008